Teleiopsis paulheberti is a moth of the family Gelechiidae. It is found in the south-western Alps, the Apennines and the Pyrenees.

The wingspan is 21–22 mm.

Etymology
The species is named for Paul D. N. Hebert of the Biodiversity Institute of Ontario, University of Guelph, Canada.

References

Moths described in 2012
Teleiopsis